Stretton Aqueduct is a short cast iron canal aqueduct between Stretton and Brewood, and near to Belvide Reservoir, in south Staffordshire, England. Designed by Thomas Telford and bearing his name plus its date of construction, 1832, it carries the Shropshire Union Canal (formerly the Birmingham and Liverpool Junction Canal)  over the A5 road at a skewed angle.

It was cast by William Hazledine of Shrewsbury. The Staffordshire blue brick abutments have stone dressings.

It was one of Telford's last aqueducts and has been grade II listed since 1985.

See also
List of canal aqueducts in the United Kingdom
Nantwich Aqueduct

References 

Bridges by Thomas Telford
Shropshire Union Canal
Bridges completed in 1833
Grade II listed buildings in Staffordshire
Navigable aqueducts in England
Grade II listed bridges
Grade II listed canals
Bridges in Staffordshire
Cast iron aqueducts